Salma Islam (born 1 January 1955) is a Bangladeshi lawyer, journalist, politician, and an MP from 11th parliament (reserved seat). She was an MP of Bangladesh Jatiya Sangsad representing the Dhaka-1 constituency. She served as state minister of the Bangladesh government for Ministry of Women and Children Affairs. She is the Member of Presidium as well as current chair of Dhaka (district unit) of Jatiya Party (Ershad). She has been made the new chairman of Jamuna Group after the death of her husband and the conglomerate's founder chairman Nurul Islam Babul.

Career
Islam served as the publisher and editor of Jugantor. The all-party interim government headed by Prime Minister Sheikh Hasina. President Abdul Hamid administered the oath at the presidential palace. She was taking oath as a member of the constituents of the Awami League-led grand alliance. In December 2013, She, along with six others ministers and advisors of Jatiya Party resigned following the directive of the party chief. She was elected to parliament from Dhaka-1 constituency in 2014 as a Jatiya Party candidate. In 2019, she selected as a Dhaka district Jatiya Party President.

References

Living people
1955 births
Jatiya Party politicians
9th Jatiya Sangsad members
10th Jatiya Sangsad members
11th Jatiya Sangsad members
Bangladeshi women journalists
Women members of the Jatiya Sangsad
Place of birth missing (living people)
21st-century Bangladeshi women politicians